Arthur Cyril William Hutchinson FRSE (26 July 1889 – 16 December 1969) was a British professor of dentistry.

Life

Hutchinson was born in Oldham on 26 July 1889, the son of Reverend William Roberts Hutchinson. He was raised in Oldham and educated at Oundle School. He studied dentistry at the University of Manchester, graduating with a BDS in 1911.

In 1935, he was elected an Honorary Fellow of the Royal Society of Edinburgh. His proposers were Sir Sydney Alfred Smith, James Couper Brash, Alexander Murray Drennan, Alfred Joseph Clark and Thomas Johnson.

From 1951 to 1958, he was Professor of Dental Surgery at the University of Edinburgh, and in later life was awarded honorary doctorates (DDS) from both the University of Edinburgh and the University of the Witwatersrand.

He died in Edinburgh on 16 December 1969.

Publications

Dental and Oral X-ray Diagnosis (1954)

Family

In 1918, he married Dorothy Mary Orme.

References

1889 births
1969 deaths
People from Oldham
Alumni of the University of Manchester
Academics of the University of Edinburgh
Fellows of the Royal Society of Edinburgh
British dentists
20th-century dentists